Ernst von Possart (11 May 18418 April 1921) was a German actor and theatre director.

Possart was born in Berlin and was early an actor at Breslau, Bern, and Hamburg. Connected with the Munich Court Theatre after 1864, he became the oberregisseur in 1875. In 1877 he was made director of the Bavarian royal theatres; from 1887 to 1892 toured the United States, Germany, Russia, and The Netherlands;  in 1895 to 1905 was general director of the Bayerische Hoftheater;  and in 1901 opened the  Prinzregententheater (Prince Regent's Theatre).

In 1897, in return for Possart assisting him in gaining an orchestral post in Munich, Richard Strauss wrote a recitation for narrator and piano.  They performed Enoch Arden in a number of cities. On February 15, 1878, Henrik Ibsen wrote him a personal letter commending him on his "genius" performance as "Konsul Bernick" in Ibsens play "Pillars of society" which had its opening date in Königliches Residenz-Theater, Munich 10 days earlier.
 
In the private royal theatre (the Residenz) he produced several of Mozart's operas. Among his own roles were Nathan, Gessler, Mephisto, Iago, and Shylock. He edited German versions of King Lear (1875),  The Merchant of Venice (1880),  and Coriolanus;  wrote the plays Der Deutschfranzösische Krieg (1871),  Recht des Herzens (1898), and Im Aussichtswagen (1898);  and published Aufgabe der Schauspielkunst (1895),  Lehrgang des Schauspielers (1901), and descriptions of many of his own productions.

In 1868 Possart married opera singer Anna Deinet. In 1875 their daughter Ernestine von Possart (1875-1946) was born. Ernestine was married to operatic tenor Robert Hutt and also had a highly successful career as an operatic soprano, using the stage name Ernesta Delsarta. In 1883 Possart and Deinet divorced, but the couple reconciled and were remarried in New York City in 1888. Possart died in Munich, Germany at age 79.

References

1841 births
1921 deaths
German male stage actors
German opera composers
Male opera composers
German theatre directors
German opera directors
Male actors from Berlin
People from the Province of Brandenburg
19th-century German male actors
German male writers
German male classical composers